The 2009 Asian Wrestling Championships were held in Pattaya, Thailand. The event took place from May 2 to May 7, 2009.

Medal table

Team ranking

Medal summary

Men's freestyle

Men's Greco-Roman

Women's freestyle

Participating nations 
244 competitors from 25 nations competed.

 (20)
 (16)
 (19)
 (7)
 (14)
 (7)
 (20)
 (2)
 (21)
 (19)
 (2)
 (13)
 (9)
 (2)
 (1)
 (4)
 (2)
 (21)
 (5)
 (6)
 (3)
 (14)
 (6)
 (1)
 (10)

References
UWW Database

External links
Official website

Asia
W
Asian Wrestling Championships
W